Cupid Making His Bow (c. 1533–1535) is a painting by the Italian late Renaissance artist Parmigianino. It is housed in the Kunsthistorisches Museum,  Vienna, Austria.

History
The work appears in the inventory of Francesco Baiardo in Parma, who was a friend and patron of  Parmigianino. Late Renaissance art biographer Giorgio Vasari writes that Baiardo had commissioned the  Cupido che fabbrica di sua mano un arco.

The painting was inherited by  Marcantonio Cavalca and later went to  Antonio Pérez, secretary of state of Philip II of Spain, who brought it with him to Spain. In 1579 Pérez fell in disgrace, and was forced to sell the painting to an envoy of emperor Rudolf II, Holy Roman Emperor. It was however blocked by the Spanish crown, and could be acquired and arrive to Prague, together with Correggio's Jupiter and Io  and Ganymede Abducted by the Eagle, in 1603. It was transferred to Vienna's Schatzkammer in 1631.

A preparatory drawing for Cupid's head is in the Cabinet des Dessins of the Louvre (n. 1662). The work was frequently copied and used as a model by numerous artists. There are copies by Joseph Heintz the Elder and Rubens in the Alte Pinakothek of Munich.

See also
Ganymede Abducted by the Eagle

References

Sources

External links

Page at museum's website 

Paintings by Parmigianino
1530s paintings
Paintings in the collection of the Kunsthistorisches Museum
Paintings of Cupid
Nude art
Paintings of children
Books in art